Seabelo Mohanoe Senatla (born 10 February 1993) is a South African rugby union player for the South African Sevens Side. His regular position is winger.

Senatla was a member of the South Africa Sevens team that won a bronze medal at the 2016 Summer Olympics.

Career

Youth
Senatla was born in Welkom, South Africa. Playing schoolboy rugby for Riebeeckstad High School in Welkom, Senatla earned selection in the  side that played at the Under-16 Grant Khomo Week tournament in 2009, as well as the Under-18 Academy Week tournament in 2010. He was also a member of the  side that played in the 2011 Under-19 Provincial Championship, scoring four tries in eight starts.

In 2012, Senatla moved to Bloemfontein, where he played for university side  during the 2012 Varsity Shield competition. His impressive try-scoring form for the  side during the 2012 Under-19 Provincial Championship – scoring seven tries in eight starts, which included two hat-tricks against  and the  – saw him make the step up to the  side, scoring one try in five appearances during the 2012 Under-21 Provincial Championship.

Rugby sevens
Senatla also caught the attention of the Blitzbokke and he signed a two-year contract with SARU to play for them on the IRB Sevens World Series circuit for in 2013 and 2014. He debuted at the 2013 Wellington Sevens tournament and played in five tournaments during the 2012–13 IRB Sevens World Series. He also represented them at the 2013 Rugby World Cup Sevens as they were knocked out in the quarter-finals, before being part of the squad that won gold at the 2013 World Games in Cali.

In December 2013, Senatla extended his contract with SARU until December 2016. He featured in a further five tournaments during the 2013–14 IRB Sevens World Series and topped the try-scoring charts for the Blitzbokke, scoring 29 tries during the season.

Junior World Championship
Senatla was selected in the South Africa Under-20 side that played in the 2013 IRB Junior World Championship in France. He scored four tries in their opening match, a 97–0 victory over the United States. He got another two tries in their 31–24 victory over eventual champions England, and played in their match against hosts France. He played in their semi-final clash with Wales, where South Africa suffered an 18–17 defeat. He was also in the run-on side that met New Zealand in the third-placed play-off and scored one of six South African tries as they beat New Zealand 41–34 to secure third-place.

Western Province / Stormers
Senatla played in and won the 2014 Currie Cup final.

2016 Summer Olympics
Senatla was included in a 12-man squad for the 2016 Summer Olympics in Rio de Janeiro. He was named in the starting line-up for their first match in Group B of the competition against Spain, scoring a try as South Africa won the match 24–0.

Notes

References

External links
 
 

1993 births
Living people
Commonwealth Games gold medallists for South Africa
Commonwealth Games medallists in rugby sevens
Commonwealth Games rugby sevens players of South Africa
Competitors at the 2013 World Games
Olympic rugby sevens players of South Africa
Rugby sevens players at the 2014 Commonwealth Games
Rugby sevens players at the 2016 Summer Olympics
Rugby union players from Welkom
Rugby union wings
South Africa international rugby sevens players
South Africa Under-20 international rugby union players
South African rugby union players
Stormers players
Western Province (rugby union) players
World Games gold medalists
Medallists at the 2014 Commonwealth Games